High Heat Baseball 1999, also known as High Heat Baseball or High Heat, is a video game released in 1998, and is the first game in the High Heat Major League Baseball video game series.

Gameplay

Reception

The game received "average" reviews according to the review aggregation website GameRankings.

References

1998 video games
Major League Baseball video games
Video games developed in the United States
Windows games
Windows-only games